John Leishman McDougall VC (1839 – 10 March 1869) was a Scottish recipient of the Victoria Cross, the highest and most prestigious award for gallantry in the face of the enemy that can be awarded to British and Commonwealth forces.

Details
He was approximately 21 years old, and a private in the 44th (East Essex) Regiment of Foot (later The Essex Regiment), British Army during the Second China War when the following deed took place for which he was awarded the VC.

On 21 August 1860 at the Taku Forts, China, Private McDougall with an officer of his regiment (Robert Montresor Rogers) and a lieutenant of the 67th Regiment (Edmund Henry Lenon) displayed great gallantry in swimming the ditches and entering the North Taku Fort by an embrasure during the assault. They were the first of the British established on the walls of the Fort.

Until 1990 he laid in an unmarked grave. A campaign at that time added a stone to all unmarked VC winners. He is buried in Old Calton Cemetery. The grave lies to the north-east, not far from the main entrance.

The medal
The VC was stolen from the family home in 1960 and never recovered. The ribbon and bar are displayed at The Essex Regiment Museum, Chelmsford, Essex, England.

See also
List of Scottish Victoria Cross recipients

References

Monuments to Courage (David Harvey, 1999)
The Register of the Victoria Cross (This England, 1997)
Scotland's Forgotten Valour (Graham Ross, 1995)

External links
Location of grave and VC medal (Edinburgh)

British recipients of the Victoria Cross
Essex Regiment soldiers
British Army personnel of the Second Opium War
Military personnel from Edinburgh
1839 births
1869 deaths
Burials at Old Calton Burial Ground
British Army recipients of the Victoria Cross